The Bamboko are a Bantu ethnic group of the Republic of Cameroon. They are part of the Sawa ethnic groups, those who live on the coast. 

The Bamboko probably moved to Mboko, the area southwest of Mount Cameroon, in the early 17th century. Predominant Bakweri and Isubu traditions claim they originated from this area, which supports the peoples' long shared histories and similar languages. They currently inhabit the west and northwest of the mountain, beginning at the villages of Sanje and Mukundage and continuing to the sea. This territory likes in the Fako and Meme divisions of the Southwest Province. Neighbouring the Bamboko to the east are the Bakweri and to the north are the Bakole. The Bamboko are primarily subsistence farmers who toil the volcanic soils of Mount Cameroon to cultivate cocoyams, maize, manioc, oil palms, and plantains.

The Bamboko speak Wumboko. The tongue is largely intelligible with Mokpwe and Bakole, and linguists sometimes classify Wumboko as a dialect of Mokpwe. All of these languages are part of the Bantu group of the Niger–Congo language family.

In addition, individuals who have attended school or lived in an urban centre usually speak Cameroonian Pidgin English or standard English. Increasing numbers of Anglophone Cameroonians are today being raised as first-language Pidgin speakers.

Notes

References
 Fanso, V. G. (1989). Cameroon History for Secondary Schools and Colleges, Vol. 1: From Prehistoric Times to the Nineteenth Century. Hong Kong: Macmillan Education Ltd.
 Gordon, Raymond G., Jr. (ed.) (2005): "Mokpwe". Ethnologue: Languages of the World, 15th ed. Dallas: SIL International. Accessed 6 June 2006.
 Gordon, Raymond G., Jr. (ed.) (2005): "Pidgin, Cameroon". Ethnologue: Languages of the World, 15th ed. Dallas: SIL International. Accessed 6 June 2006.
 Gordon, Raymond G., Jr. (ed.) (2005): "Wumboko". Ethnologue: Languages of the World, 15th ed. Dallas: SIL International. Accessed 6 June 2006.

External links
 Bakwerirama
 Peuple Sawa (in French)